Building 55 is an EP released in 1999 by Canadian singer-songwriter Kathleen Edwards. Only 500 copies of the EP were printed, and it became a highly sought-after collector's item after her commercial breakthrough with her full-length debut album Failer.

Edwards has stated that she gave away just as many copies of the album while on tour as she sold.

Track listing
"Injustica" – 5:11
"Nagasaki" – 4:34
"5 Years" – 6:06
"Bigstar" – 4:04
"Wordgamething" – 4:29
"Violin for Mom" – 0:39
"Titled Untitled" – 5:00

References

1999 EPs
Kathleen Edwards albums